Théodore Reinach (3 July 186028 October 1928) was a French archaeologist, mathematician, lawyer, papyrologist, philologist, epigrapher, historian, numismatist, musicologist, professor, and politician.

Academic career

Educated at the Lycée Condorcet, Ecole des Hautes Etudes, Ecole des Sciences Politiques, Reinach had a brilliant career as a scholar and was called to the Parisian bar where he practised from 1881 to 1886 but eventually devoted himself to the study of numismatics.  He became Chair in ancient numismatics at the Collège de France and was a director of various journals. In 1916, he was awarded the medal of the Royal Numismatic Society and in 1917, during World War I, he worked on assignment in the United States.

He received an honorary Doctorate of Letters (D.Litt.) from the University of Dublin in June 1902.

Théodore Reinach was president of the French association of musicologists Société française de musicologie in 1928.

Family and Villa Kerylos
In 1886, Reinach married Charlotte Marie Evelyne Hirsch. They had two daughters but she died at age twenty-six in 1889. Reinach married a second time in 1891 to Fanny Kann, a daughter of Maximilien Kann and Betty Ephrussi. They made their home in a chateau at La Motte-Servolex in the Savoie department in southeastern France. As a resident there, Reinach was elected to the Chamber of Deputies of France as a member of the Bloc des gauches, serving from 1906 to 1914.

The Reinachs spent time on the French Riviera and in 1902 hired the architect Emmanuel Pontremoli to design a villa at Beaulieu-sur-Mer. Completed in 1908 the Greek-style property was named Villa Kerylos.

Fanny Reinach died in 1917 and Theodore in 1928. He was a member of the Institut de France and on his death he bequeathed the Villa Kerylos to the Institut.

Reinach's son, Léon (1893–1943), became the keeper of the archives at Villa Kerylos. Léon Reinach was married to Béatrice de Camondo with whom he had two children. Following the German occupation of France during World War II, the Villa was seized by the Nazis and Léon and Béatrice Reinach and their two children were sent to Auschwitz concentration camp where they were murdered.

After the War, other of the Reinach children and grandchildren continued to live there until 1967. Today, the Villa Kerylos is a museum open to the public.

Fanny Reinach's mother was a member of the Ephrussi family whose cousin Maurice was married to Béatrice de Rothschild. Inspired by the beauty of the Reinach's Villa Grecque Kérylos and the area, nearby they built Villa Ephrussi de Rothschild.

References

Sources
Théodore Reinach at the Jewish Encyclopedia.com

External links
 

1860 births
1928 deaths
People from Saint-Germain-en-Laye
French people of German-Jewish descent
Jewish French politicians
Politicians from Île-de-France
Independent Radical politicians
Members of the 9th Chamber of Deputies of the French Third Republic
Members of the 10th Chamber of Deputies of the French Third Republic
19th-century French lawyers
19th-century French mathematicians
French archaeologists
19th-century French historians
20th-century French historians
19th-century French musicologists
20th-century French musicologists
French philologists
French male non-fiction writers
Ephrussi family
Lycée Condorcet alumni
Chevaliers of the Légion d'honneur
Presidents of the Société française de musicologie
19th-century musicologists
Papyrologists